Noella or Noëlla is a feminine given name. It is related to the name Noelle.

People with the given name 
 Noëlla Champagne (born 1944), Canadian politician from Quebec
 Noella Leduc (1933–2014), American baseball player
 Noella Marcellino (born 1951), American Benedictine nun 
 Noella Uloko (born 1989), Nigerian contemporary Christian singer-songwriter
 Noella Wiyaala (born 1986), Ghanaian Afro-pop singer-songwriter

See also 
 Marie-Noëlle
 Noelle
 Noel (name)
 Nel (name)

Feminine given names
French feminine given names
English feminine given names